Faisal Marzouk is a Kuwaiti swimmer. He competed in the men's 100 metre butterfly at the 1984 Summer Olympics.

References

External links
 

Year of birth missing (living people)
Living people
Kuwaiti male swimmers
Olympic swimmers of Kuwait
Swimmers at the 1984 Summer Olympics
Place of birth missing (living people)